The NBR 141 Class consisted of two steam  locomotives built by the North British Railway (NBR) in 1869. They were the direct antecedents of the NBR 224 Class .

History
Thomas Wheatley became locomotive superintendent of the North British Railway (NBR) at the start of February 1867. During his tenure of seven years, he provided the NBR with 185 new locomotives; but only eight of these were suitable for hauling express passenger trains, the first two of which were these s, nos. 141 and 164, which were built in 1869; the remaining six were the s of the 224 and 420 Classes, introduced in 1871 and 1873 respectively.

The boilers were domeless, with the safety-valves mounted above the firebox. The frames were single, the driving wheel splashers had eight slots; there was no cab, but a weatherboard with two circular windows. The six-wheel tender held  of water.

Rebuilding
On the NBR, locomotives were generally rebuilt when their boilers wore out. Matthew Holmes, locomotive superintendent of the NBR between 1882 and 1903, rebuilt both locomotives in 1890; amongst the improvements were a domed boiler, Westinghouse brake and a cab.

Final years
Every six months, the NBR renumbered some of its older locomotives into a "duplicate list", in order to vacate numbers for new construction. Accordingly, in 1912, nos. 141 and 164 were placed on the duplicate list, becoming nos. 1158/60 respectively. They were both withdrawn from service in 1915 and scrapped in 1923.

Summary

The locomotives may have been named after 1875 – it has been stated that Drummond, who replaced Wheatley in 1875, named NBR engines "including those already in service".

Notes

References

141
2-4-0 locomotives
Railway locomotives introduced in 1869
Scrapped locomotives
Standard gauge steam locomotives of Great Britain
Passenger locomotives